The Singing Sand Dunes ( Ming Sha Shan) in Dunhuang, China, are the sand dunes that, when the wind blows, give out a singing or drumming sound. They are part of the Kumtag Desert.

The Singing Sand Dunes were originally known as the "Gods' Sand Dunes". In the Records of the Grand Historian, Sima Qian described the sound "as if listening to music when the weather is fine." During the Ming Dynasty, they came to be called by the current name.

There are four better-known singing sand dunes in China, that include those of Hami, which are usually said to give the best sound among the four, and those of Dunhuang.

The tourist area at the site offers various facilities and activities such as ATV riding, paragliding, camel rides and sandboarding.

See also
Singing sand
Mogao Caves: nearby

References

Physical phenomena
AAAAA-rated tourist attractions
Dunes of China
Dunhuang
Hami